|}

The Height of Fashion Stakes is a Listed flat horse race in Great Britain open to three-year-old fillies. It is run at Goodwood over a distance of 1 mile, 1 furlong and 197 yards (1,991 metres), and it is scheduled to take place each year in May.

History
The event was established in 1972, and it was originally called the Lupe Stakes. It was named after Lupe, the winner of The Oaks in 1970.

The race was renamed the Height of Fashion Stakes in 2007. It now pays tribute to Height of Fashion, a filly whose victories included the Lupe Stakes in 1982. She became a successful broodmare, and was the dam of Unfuwain, Nashwan and Nayef.

The Height of Fashion Stakes sometimes serves as a trial for the Epsom Oaks. The last horse to win both races was Snow Fairy in 2010.

Records
Leading jockey (6 wins):
 Willie Carson – Cistus (1978), Height of Fashion (1982), Oumaldaaya (1992), Gisarne (1993), Bulaxie (1994), Subya (1995)

Leading trainer (6 wins):
 John Dunlop – Oumaldaaya (1992), Gisarne (1993), Bulaxie (1994), Subya (1995), Claxon (1999), Beatrice Aurore (2011)

Winners

See also
 Horse racing in Great Britain
 List of British flat horse races
 Recurring sporting events established in 1972 – this race is included under its original title, Lupe Stakes.

References

 Paris-Turf:
 Racing Post:

Flat races in Great Britain
Goodwood Racecourse
Flat horse races for three-year-old fillies
1972 establishments in England